Hussain Munawwar  (born 5 February 1998), commonly known as Kuda Foolhu is a Maldivian film director, cinematographer, producer and actor.

Career
In 2006, Munawwar starred as the character Kudafoolhu, a manipulative devil under the strict instructions of his master, in the first installment of Yoosuf Shafeeu-directed short film series, Vasvaas which proved to be a breakthrough for him with his humorous and child-friendly act. He reprised the role in several of his other ventures including Kudafoolhuge Vasvaas (2006) and Kudafoolhaai Paree Dhahtha (2007). His performance in playing the character fetched him a Maldives Film Award for Best Actor in short films category.

In 2011, Munawwar starred as gangster in the Moomin Fuad-directed crime tragedy drama Loodhifa. Featuring an ensemble cast, the film deals with modern social issues in society told from the different perspectives of the characters. Made on a budget of MVR 600,000, the film was declared a commercial failure though it received wide critical acclaim. He made his directorial debut with the romantic drama film Sazaa, featuring Ismail Rasheed, Niuma Mohamed and Lufshan Shakeeb. The story revolves around a carefree woman whose life is turned upside down when she is forced to marry a brutal man. His debut as a director was appreciated by the critics and emerged as a commercial success. At the 7th Gaumee Film Awards ceremony, Munawwar was bestowed with the Best Cinematographer award for Sazaa while being nominated in the same category for Loodhifa (2011) and Ingili (2013).

Following the success of Sazaa, Munawwar directed his second feature film, Dhilakani which stars Ismail Rasheed, Niuma Mohamed, Mohamed Manik, Aminath Rishfa and Mohamed Faisal in main roles. The film which deals with a man's tumultuous journey to seek vengeance, his undoing and his eventual redemption from an unlikeliest of sources, received negative reception from critics. Ahmed Nadheem from Haveeru wrote: "The film is similar to a ship without a direction, an aimless screenplay leading the director to no path. Embraced with futile characters, impractical scenes and out-dated music, the film has problems in each department". Despite the negative reviews, Munawwar received a nomination as the Best Director at the 3rd Maldives Film Awards.

In 2016, Munawwar directed the film Neyngi Yaaru Vakivee featuring Ahmed Azmeel, Maleeha Waheed, Ismail Jumaih and Aminath Rishfa. Critics gave the film negative reviews, considering it a "boring" and "forced" attempt at film production. Despite the negative reviews, the film did average business at the end of its theatrical run.

Filmography

Feature film

Television

Short film

Other work

Discography

Accolades

References 

Maldivian male film actors
1988 births
Living people
Maldivian film directors
Maldivian cinematographers